Myriopholis burii, commonly known as the Arabian blind snake or Bury's worm snake, is a species of snake in the family Leptotyphlopidae. The species is endemic to the Arabian Peninsula.

Etymology
The specific name, burii, is in honor of British naturalist George Wyman Bury (1874-1920).

Geographic range

Behavior
M. burii is fossorial.

Diet
The diet of M. burii consists of ant larvae.

Reproduction
M. burii is oviparous.

References

Further reading
Adalsteinsson SA, Branch WR, Trape S, Vitt LJ, Hedges SB (2009). "Molecular phylogeny, classification, and biogeography of snakes of the Family Leptotyphlopidae (Reptilia, Squamata)". Zootaxa 2244: 1-50. (Myriopholis burii, new combination, p. 28).
Boulenger GA (1905). "Descriptions of Three new Snakes discovered in South Arabia by Mr. G. W. Bury". Annals and Magazine of Natural History, Seventh Series 16: 178-180. ("Glauconia Burii [sic]", new species, p. 178).
Corkill NL, Cochrane JA (1966). "The snakes of the Arabian Peninsula and Socotra". Journal of the Bombay Natural History Society 62 (3): 475-506. (Leptotyphlops burii, new combination).
Egan, Damien (2008). Snakes of Arabia: A Field Guide to the Snakes of the Arabian Peninsula and its Shores. Dubai: Motivate Publishing. 208 pp., 157 color photographs, 114 drawings, 55 maps. .

Myriopholis
Reptiles described in 1905